Helen Nash is the cellist for the electric string quartet Escala.

Nash comes from Cornwall, England.

Education 
Nash studied cello at the Royal Welsh College of Music and Drama.

Career 
Nash has appeared at Kensington Palace, The Royal Albert Hall, O2 arena, The Royal Variety Performance 2012 and 2013, and others.
Nash is a cellist with Escala.

In 2015, Nash became a producer of the film, Cornish Cowboy which premiered at the Cannes Film Festival.

In 2018, Nash is ranked #4 as Cornwall Sexy List 2018.

Filmography

Films 
 2015 Cornish Cowboy - short. producer.
 2015 Black Mountain Poets - music composer.
 2017 The Eighth Wonder - writer and producer.
 2017 The Horse Whisperer of Bodmin Moor - producer.

Television series 
 2012 The Royal Variety Performance - as herself.
 2016 The Royal Variety Performance - as herself.

See also 
 List of Royal Variety Performances

References

External links 
 Official website
 
 Escala website
 Helen Nash at discogs.com

British cellists
Women cellists
Living people
Year of birth missing (living people)
Musicians from Cornwall